Hayt may refer to:

People
 Charles Hayt (1850–1927), American attorney
 Harry H. Pratt (1864–1932)
 Stephen T. Hayt (1822–1907), American politician

Places
 Hayt Golf Learning Center

Other
 Hayt, the name of the Duncan Idaho clone in Frank Herbert's Dune series.

See also
 Hait (disambiguation)